Silonga  is a ward in Gwanda District of Matabeleland South province in southern Zimbabwe.

Wards of Zimbabwe
Gwanda District